VOC exempt solvents are organic compounds that are exempt from restrictions placed on most volatile organic compounds (VOCs) in the United States. This class of solvent currently includes acetone, dimethyl carbonate, methyl acetate, parachlorobenzotrifluoride (Oxsol 100), tert-Butyl acetate, and propylene carbonate. The definition is often that they do not contribute to ozone or ozone depletion.

Solvent 
In the US, dimethyl carbonate was exempted under the definition of volatile organic compounds (VOCs) by the U.S. EPA in 2009.  Due to its classification as VOC exempt, dimethyl carbonate has grown in popularity and applications as a replacement for methyl ethyl ketone (MEK) and other solvents. tert-Butyl acetate is used as a solvent in the production of lacquers, enamels, inks, adhesives, thinners and industrial cleaners.  It also gained EPA VOC exempt status.

Uses
VOC exempt solvents are used in applications where traditional solvents are used. These include Coatings, Adhesives, Sealants and Elastomers.

Safety

VOC exempt status does not mean that the solvent is non-flammable and thus safety must be carefully considered. Acetone for example has an  extremely low flash point and care is needed in handling.

See also

Greenhouse gas
Ozone depletion

References

Regulation of chemicals
Solvents
Regulation in the United States